Antoni Rokita (25 May 1909 – 25 January 1963) was a Polish wrestler. He competed in the men's Greco-Roman bantamweight at the 1936 Summer Olympics.

References

External links
 

1909 births
1963 deaths
Polish male sport wrestlers
Olympic wrestlers of Poland
Wrestlers at the 1936 Summer Olympics
People from Puławy County
Sportspeople from Lublin Voivodeship
People from Lublin Governorate